The Nwonyo Fishing Festival is a festival celebrated by the Ibi people in Taraba State, Nigeria. The lake is located 5 kilometres North of Ibi community, it is an annually celebrated festival where Ibi and its neighboring community comes together to fish and re-unite. The lake is said to be the largest in west Africa as it run 15 kilometres to the Benue River. The name Nwonyo means Hide-out for huge and dangerous aquatic Animals such as Crocodiles, Snakes, Hippopotamus and many more.

History 
Nwonye Fishing Festival has been in existence for over 90 years and can be traced to its discovery by Buba Wurbo in 1816, he was the same person who founded Ibi community, The name Nwonyo which means Hide-out for huge and dangerous aquatic Animals such as Crocodiles, Snakes, Hippopotamus and many more. It is said that two myths describe the actual meaning of the word Nwonyo. The first myth means, “under the locust bean tree;” while the second says, “abode of the snake,” in Jukun language.

The lake in its early discovery was primarily a source of fishing to the fishing/farming communities until Buda transformed it into a festival where neighboring communities comes once a year to catch fish. The first public fishing festival was held during the reign of Abgumanu ll from (1903-1915) as the main participant are the Ibi themselves while Wukari and other neighboring communities came as spectators.

In 1943, the late Mallam Muhammadu Jikan Buba, Chief of Ibi appointed Mallam Muhammadu Sango as the custodian of the lake (Sarkin Ruwa) from (1931-1954), his duty was to secure the lake against any unauthorized fishing and to always declare the commencement of the yearly fishing festival, he patrol the lake regularly with his guards, this is done to allow the fishes grow well prior the next festival. As the years goes by, in 1954 the level of participation increased.

Festivity 
The Nwonyo festival is celebrated mostly in the dry season when the lake will not be heavy. During the festival, there are lots of activities and events that take place apart from fishing which is the festival main aim, such events are: Swimming competitions, Dance, music, and Singing Competitions, Boat regatta, Masquerades demonstration and many more.  Canoes are used in the fish catch to prevent any attack from dangerous aquatic animals like crocodiles.

Past Events 
In 1954, the festival had expanded and gained more recognition and spectators even from the Aku Uka of Wukari and his people, Mallam Adi Byewi, the Ukwe of Takum, Alhaji Ali Ibrahim, the Gara of Donga, Mallam Sambo Garbosa, and Mallam I. D. Muhammed who was the Officer-in-charge of the Wukari federation.

In 1973, the Wukari(no longer in existence) were the organizers of the festival with the help of the then Governor of Benue/Plateau State, Mr. D. Joseph Gomwalk. The festival this year was one of the best and a huge success that brought the festival to limelight, it was fully consisted of water and traditional sports. Important personnel were present, Governor of Benue/Plateau, Mr. Joseph Gomwalk and the then Col. Theophilus Danjuma,  Col. M. D. Jega (1978), Brigadier A.R.A. Mahmud (1979) and the Governor of the defunct Gongola State Alhaji Abubakar Barde.

The festival at this point started to record some significant progress, from this time biggest fish catch were recorded and the biggest catch belong to “Sarkin Ruwa”. In 1970, the biggest catch weighed 60 pounds; in 1971 “Sarki ruwa” the biggest catch weighed 175 pounds; and in 1973, the biggest catch weighed 124 pounds.

By 2008, the festival was re-introduced as an International Fishing and Cultural Festival by Governor Danbaba Danfulani Suntai. In November the same year, the governor established the Taraba State Tourism Development Board (TSTDB), and the responsibility of staging and organizing the festival was automatically transferred to the Board.

In 2009 edition, the festival was organised by the Board of the festival which it claimed was a successful outing that attracted dignitaries and tourists from far and near; and the event was capped with the biggest catch weighing 230kg. Quite a big number of important people were present which are; Senate President, Sen. David Mark, Governor Danbaba D. Suntai and two of his colleagues: Admiral Murtala H. Nyako (rtd) of Adamawa State and Alhaji Aliyu Akwe Doma of Nasarawa State. Corporate Organizations like MTN and Zenith Bank supported the festival to make the events more colourful.

In 2010, the festival started on April 24 with a colourful view and performances like Cultural troops, horse procession, canoeing, swimming, boat cruise. After few hours of fish hunting, Mr. Bulus Joshua came top with a catch weighing 318 kilogrammes followed by Mr. Dan Asabe Adata, who came second with 297kg; and Mr. Jamila Baba, came third with 195 kilogrammes. Mr. Joshua’s catch is now regarded as one of the biggest catch in the history of the fishing festival as he beat the 2009 record of 230kg. The wife of the Acting President Mrs. Patience Jonathan was present as she presented a Kia car to Mr. Joshua who has the biggest catch. Also, Nigeria Tourism Development Corporation (NTDC) was present, The Director General, Segun Runsewe was present. Lots of gifts were given such as: radios, sewing machines, bicycles, grinding machines, football, tennis kits. There were also branded T- shirts and fez caps.

References 

Festivals in Nigeria